Harald Rolf Maartmann (5 January 1926 – 1 January 2021) was a Norwegian cross-country skier who competed in the 1950s. He won both the 17 km and the 50 km event in the Norwegian Championships in 1950. He finished fifth in the 50 km event at the 1950 World Championships in Lake Placid, New York. Maartmann also finished eighth in the 50 km event at the 1952 Winter Olympics in Oslo.

He was the son of soccer player Rolf Maartmann and cousin of luger Titti Maartmann. His grandfather was Harald Sigvart Maartmann, the first Executive Director of Ringnes. His great-grandfather was Norwegian politician Knud Geelmuyden Fleischer Maartmann. 

Maartmann died on 1 January 2021, aged 94.

Cross-country skiing results
All results are sourced from the International Ski Federation (FIS).

Olympic Games

World Championships

References

Olympic 50 km cross country skiing results: 1948-64

External links

1926 births
2021 deaths
Skiers from Oslo
Cross-country skiers at the 1952 Winter Olympics
Norwegian male cross-country skiers
Olympic cross-country skiers of Norway